Ben & Holly's Little Kingdom is a British preschool animated television series. The show was created by Neville Astley and Mark Baker, and produced by Astley Baker Davies and Entertainment One (the companies responsible for Peppa Pig). The series first aired on 6 April 2009, and aired its last episode on 24 December 2013. A total of 104 episodes were produced.

Series overview

Episodes

Series 1 (2009–2011)

Series 2 (2012–2013)

References

Lists of British children's television series episodes
Lists of British animated television series episodes
Lists of Nickelodeon television series episodes